Matijas Pejić (born May 18, 1988 in Orašje) is a Bosnian-Herzegovinian professional footballer, who currently plays for HNK Mladost Domaljevac.

Club career
After spells at several clubs in Bosnia Herzegovina, Pejić left hometown club Orašje for lower league side HNKM Domaljevac in 2018.

International career
He made his debut for Bosnia and Herzegovina in a March 2008 friendly match against Macedonia, coming on as a late substitute for Zvjezdan Misimović. It remained his sole international appearance.

References

External links

1988 births
Living people
People from Orašje
Association football defenders
Bosnia and Herzegovina footballers
Bosnia and Herzegovina international footballers
HNK Orašje players
FC Zbrojovka Brno players
FK Sloboda Tuzla players
FK Velež Mostar players
NK Zvijezda Gradačac players
NK Travnik players
Premier League of Bosnia and Herzegovina players
Czech First League players
First League of the Federation of Bosnia and Herzegovina players
Bosnia and Herzegovina expatriate footballers
Expatriate footballers in the Czech Republic
Bosnia and Herzegovina expatriate sportspeople in the Czech Republic